Saundra Santiago (born April 13, 1957) is an American actress. She is best known for her role as Det. Gina Calabrese in the NBC original crime drama series Miami Vice (1984–1990). She also played Carmen Santos on the CBS soap opera Guiding Light and the second Carlotta Vega on the ABC soap opera One Life to Live.

Early life
Santiago is the daughter of a Cuban father and a Puerto Rican mother. Raised in the South Bronx, New York City, she attended Our Lady of Victory Grammar School. When she was 13 years old, her family moved to Homestead, Florida.

Santiago graduated from South Dade Senior High School and attended the University of Miami on a scholarship, majoring in psychology. As a University of Miami student, she became interested in acting. After graduation, she went on to post-graduate study in theater and arts at Southern Methodist University, eventually earning a Master of Fine Arts degree. Santiago joined the company of regional summer stock theater, Timber Lake Playhouse, Mount Carroll, Illinois, performing many roles including Maria in West Side Story in the 1980 season.

Career
In 1984, Santiago made her big screen debut appearing in the dance drama film Beat Street, and later that year began starring in the NBC crime drama series Miami Vice playing the role of Detective Gina Calabrese opposite Don Johnson. The series ran for five seasons to 1989. In 1990s, Santiago appeared in a number of made for television movies, including The Cosby Mysteries (1994) and To Sir, with Love II (1996) opposite Sidney Poitier.

In 1999, Santiago joined the cast of long-running CBS soap opera Guiding Light playing crime boss Carmen Santos. She received Daytime Emmy Award nomination for America's Favorite Villain in 2002. She left the soap after three years. She appeared simultaneously in a recurring role on The Sopranos as Tony Soprano's next door neighbor, Jeannie Cusamano, and as her twin sister, Joan from 1999 to 2007. Additionally, on television, Santiago guest-starred on Law & Order in the 1992 episode "Prince of Darkness" (episode 3.8) and in the 2004 episode "Veteran's Day" (episode 14.15).

In 2004, Santiago joined the cast ABC soap opera One Life to Live in the role of Isabella Santi/Angelina Parades after leaving Guiding Light. In 2007, she had a recurring role in the first season of FX legal thriller Damages. In 2009, she returned to One Life to Live again, this time taking over the role of Carlotta Vega from Patricia Mauceri. She remained with the show until 2011. In 2014, she returned to prime time television playing the role of Marciela Acosta, the wife of gang leader Javier Acosta, in the short-lived Fox drama series Gang Related. Santiago also guest-starred on Person of Interest, True Detective, Gotham, Blue Bloods, and Madam Secretary.

Personal life
Santiago met jazz musician Roger Squitero in 1994 whom she married in 1999.

Filmography

Film

Television

References

External links
 
 
 Saundra Santiago on Huffington Post

1957 births
American film actresses
American musical theatre actresses
American people of Cuban descent
American people of Puerto Rican descent
American television actresses
Living people
Actresses from New York City
Actresses from Miami
Southern Methodist University alumni
University of Miami alumni
People from the Bronx